James Edwin Foster (born August 28, 1950) is a Canadian singer, songwriter, guitarist, and harmonica player.

Biography
Born in Victoria, British Columbia, Foster is best known for his Canadian singles "X-Ray Eyes" and his work with his band, Fosterchild, which existed from 1976 to 1980. In 1993, Foster joined the band One Horse Blue. Foster has had success in the adult contemporary, country, and rock-music fields, writing such songs as "Here We Go Again"  for Patricia Conroy (1993), and the Western Canadian Music Award-winning "X-Ray Eyes" (1986). He also co-wrote "I Put Away My Gun" with Murray McLauchlan.

Awards
Western Canada Music Awards 1986

Discography
Albums 

Singles

See also
 One Horse Blue

References

Canadian rock singers
Canadian songwriters
Living people
1950 births
Musicians from Victoria, British Columbia